There is also a minor planet called 666 Desdemona.

Desdemona is an inner satellite of Uranus. It was discovered from the images taken by Voyager 2 on 13 January 1986, and was given the temporary designation S/1986 U 6. Desdemona is named after the wife of Othello in William Shakespeare's play Othello. It is also designated Uranus X.

Desdemona belongs to Portia Group of satellites, which also includes Bianca, Cressida, Juliet, Portia, Rosalind, Cupid, Belinda and Perdita. These satellites have similar orbits and photometric properties. Other than its orbit, radius of 32 km and geometric albedo of 0.08 virtually nothing is known about Desdemona.

At the Voyager 2 images Desdemona appears as an elongated object, the major axis pointing towards Uranus. The ratio of axes of Desdemona's prolate spheroid is 0.6 ± 0.3. Its surface is grey in color.

Desdemona may collide with one of its neighboring moons Cressida or Juliet within the next 100 million years.

See also 

 Moons of Uranus

References 

Explanatory notes

Citations

External links 
 Desdemona Profile by NASA's Solar System Exploration
 Uranus' Known Satellites (by Scott S. Sheppard)

Moons of Uranus
19860113
Othello
Moons with a prograde orbit